I-n-Azaoua  was a crude, French colonial-era redoubt built in February 1899 alongside an established well, three kilometres south of the current border line between Algeria and Niger.

History
During the French colonisation of north and west Africa, the Foureau-Lamy Mission of 1898-1900 constructed a small redoubt 800 metres from the well. The 1972 Institut géographique national NG-32-II map indicates water at a depth of 6 metres. Once the easier trans-Sahara crossing via In Guezzam was established in the 1960s, this remote 720-km track between Tamanrasset and Iferouane in Niger's northern Aïr Mountains became even less frequently used.
As tourism grew in the 1970s, the remote Algerian part of  the route to I-n Azaoua was closed by Algerian authorities and an important sign was erected 95 km south of Tamanrasset on the main In Guezzam route at the fork leading ESE for I-n Azaoua. Until that time, some travellers had mistakenly taken the I-n Azaoua route and perished.

References

External links
Satellite map at Maplandia
Trans Sahara Routes
Forts of the Sahara (in French)

Agadez Region